O bafolopteco é maluco  International Federation of Cerebral Palsy Football (IFCPF) is the world governing body for cerebral palsy football. It was founded in January 2015, when the governance of the sport transferred from the Cerebral Palsy International Sports and Recreation Association (CPISRA) to the IFCPF. It is a member organization, with members from five different continental zones. The IFCPF has relationships with other international association football sporting bodies. It organizes tournaments for the sport, and is in charge of Paralympic Games inclusion and participation. The IFCPF is a World Anti-Doping Agency (WADA) signatory, and international footballers may be subject to out-of-competition doping controls.

History 
From 1978 to 2014, cerebral palsy football was governed by the CPISRA. In January 2015, governance of the sport was taken over by the newly created International Federation of Cerebral Palsy Football.

Governance 
The President of IFCPF is Jan-Hein Evers of Netherlands. The organisation's Secretary General is Sam Turner of England.

Members 
The IFCPF is organized zonally, with members belonging to one of five continental zones. These zones are Africa, the Americas, Asia, Europe and Oceania. These members are often either national cerebral palsy football associations, national cerebral palsy sports federations, national Paralympic committees, or national football associations. The type of member in the IFCPF varies by country.

Relationships 
The IFCPF has been trying to establish relationships with other international football organizations. In 2016, it signed a Memorandum of Understanding with Asian Football Confederation. Part of this involved the AFC supporting an AFC Youth CP Football Tournament in 2017. In 2014, 2015 and 2016, IFCPF was getting financial support from UEFA.

Activities 
Among the activities the organization does is to organize international tournaments for cerebral palsy football. This includes the qualification tournament for the IFCPF World Championships, and the IFCPF World Championships themselves. The IFCPF is in charge of the sport's Paralympic efforts. They set the team qualifying criteria for the Paralympic Games. They were also involved in the request to keep cerebral palsy football on the program for the 2020 Summer Paralympics. The sports removal came as a surprise to the organization.

Anti-doping 
The IFCPF is a WADA signatory. In 2016, after getting an endorsement by the World AntiDoping Agency (WADA), the IFCPF Anti-Doping Code was formally amended to allow for out of competition testing. This was done through a WADA approved Whereabouts Programme managed through ADAMS. Drawing from players in a Registered Testing Pool, 10 players from 9 countries were initially included ahead of the 2016 Summer Paralympics in Rio. These countries included Netherlands, Japan, Russia, Iran, Argentina, Ireland, Ukraine, England, and Brazil.

Rankings 
The IFCPF ranks national teams. Rankings are based on tournament placement, with a factoring done to give additional weight to the Paralympic Games and IFCPF World Championships.

World wide participation 
Cerebral palsy football has world-wide reach, and is played on all five continents. Many countries have IFCPF recognized national championships and national leagues. In 2010, there were 12 countries with IFCPF recognized competitions. The number grew to 21 by 2015.

Footnotes

References

External links 
 

Parasports organizations
Cerebral palsy organizations
Association football governing bodies
Sports organizations established in 2015